Historias de los señores Moc y Poc is an Argentine children's book by Luis Pescetti. It was first published in 1997.

Books by Luis Pescetti
1997 Argentine novels
Children's novels
1997 children's books